Karl Amon (born 19 August 1995) is an Australian rules footballer playing for the Hawthorn Football Club in the Australian Football League (AFL). He previously played for the Port Adelaide Football Club from 2014 to 2022.

Early life
At age 5, Karl Amon was diagnosed with Perthes disease, undergoing several operations, including five on his hip. Between the ages of 5 and 8, he was regularly in hospital and spent a year in a wheelchair followed by a year on crutches. Karl Amon played his junior football at the Hampton Rovers Football Club and also played one senior VAFA game at the football club he was participating in at that time.

AFL career
Amon was drafted by Port Adelaide with the 68th selection in the 2013 AFL draft.

Amon built up his form at SANFL level in 2014, picking up more of the ball and improving his skill level under pressure. He made his senior debut in round 7, 2015 against the Brisbane Lions at the Gabba, where he gathered 9 disposals and kicked a goal. He played 7 matches for the season, being a substitute in 5 of them. In one of his two full games against the Gold Coast Suns, he had 16 possessions and kicked 3 goals.

After an injured-ravaged 2018 season, Amon returned in 2019 and cemented his spot in the senior side, playing 73 games in a row from mid-2019 to the end of 2022.

Statistics
Updated to the end of round 1, 2023.

|-
| 2015 ||  || 15
| 7 || 5 || 3 || 48 ||25 || 73 || 17 || 17 || 0.7 || 0.4 || 6.9 || 3.6 || 10.5 || 2.4 || 2.4 || 0
|-
| 2016 ||  || 15
| 15 || 10 || 6 || 134 || 77 || 211 || 45 || 38 ||0.7 || 0.4 || 8.9 || 5.1 || 14.0 || 3.0 || 2.5 || 0
|-
| 2017 ||  || 15
| 14 || 5 || 5 || 153 || 109 || 262 || 58 || 34 || 0.4 ||0.4 || 10.9 || 7.8 || 18.7 || 4.1 || 2.4 || 0
|-
| 2018 ||  || 15
| 6 || 2 || 0 || 46 || 46 || 92 || 14 || 10 || 0.3 || 0.0 || 7.7 || 7.7 || 15.3 || 2.3 || 1.7 || 0
|-
| 2019 ||  || 15
| 17 || 9 || 11 || 188 || 146 || 334 || 63 || 52 || 0.5 || 0.7 || 11.1 || 8.6 || 19.7 || 3.7 || 3.1 || 1
|-
| 2020 ||  ||15 
| 19 || 5 || 8 || 199 || 107 || 306 || 58 || 55 || 0.3 || 0.4 || 10.5 || 5.6 || 16.1 || 3.1 || 2.9 || 1
|-
| 2021 ||  || 15
| 24 || 11 || 17 || 370 || 196 || 566 || 141 || 98 || 0.5 || 0.7 || 15.4 || 8.2 || 23.6 || 5.9 || 4.1 || 11
|-
| 2022 ||  || 15
| 22 || 8 || 15 || 342 || 178 || 520 || 128 || 81 || 0.4 || 0.7 || 15.5 || 8.1 || 23.6 || 5.8 || 3.7 || 15
|-
| 2023 ||  || 10
| 1 || 1 || 0 || 12 || 8 || 20 || 4 || 1 || 1.0 || 0.0 || 12.0 || 8.0 || 20.0 || 4.0 || 1.0 || 
|- class=sortbottom
! colspan=3 | Career
! 125 !! 56 !! 65 !! 1492 !! 892 !! 2384 !! 528 !! 386 !! 0.4 !! 0.5 !! 11.9 !! 7.1 !! 19.1 !! 4.2 !! 3.1 !! 28
|}

Notes

References

External links

Living people
1995 births
People educated at Haileybury (Melbourne)
Australian rules footballers from Victoria (Australia)
Port Adelaide Football Club (SANFL) players
Sandringham Dragons players
Port Adelaide Football Club players
Port Adelaide Football Club players (all competitions)
Indigenous Australian players of Australian rules football
Hawthorn Football Club players